Arch'il, of the Chosroid Dynasty, was the king of Iberia (Kartli, eastern Georgia) from c. 411 to 435. He was the son and successor of King Mirdat IV.

The two principal medieval Georgian chronicles – The Conversion of Kartli, and The Life of Kartli, – relate conflicting versions of Archil’s reign. The former story is extremely brief but regretfully indicates that the positions of Zoroastrianism, an official Sasanid religion, was firm in Christian Iberia, a testimony to the effectively unchallenged Sasanid hegemony over the country. The other chronicle informs us of Archil’s successful rebellion against Iran, his victory over a punitive force and a retaliatory raid into Arran. The authenticity of this latter account has been questioned by modern scholars.

Arch'il is also attested in two Armenian sources: Koryun’s The Life of Mashtots, cap. 18; and Moses of Chorene, III.60.

References 

Chosroid kings of Iberia
Year of birth missing
435 deaths
5th-century monarchs in Asia
Vassal rulers of the Sasanian Empire
Georgians from the Sasanian Empire